Daniel Crista (born 19 January 1991) is a Romanian racing cyclist, who rides for Romanian amateur team CSA Steaua București.

Major results

Road
Source: 

2013
 6th Road race, National Road Championships
 6th Time trial, National Under-23 Road Championships
2014
 5th Road race, National Road Championships
2015
 National Road Championships
2nd Time trial
5th Road race
2016
 National Road Championships
2nd Road race
3rd Time trial
 7th Overall Tour de Hongrie
 7th Overall Tour of Szeklerland
2017
 1st  Mountains classification, Tour de Serbie
 National Road Championships
2nd Time trial
6th Road race
 7th Overall Tour of Szeklerland
2018
 National Road Championships
2nd Time trial
2nd Road race
 5th Overall Tour of Szeklerland
1st Prologue
 7th Overall Tour of Fatih Sultan Mehmet
2019
 1st Prologue Tour of Szeklerland
 2nd Time trial, National Road Championships
 9th Grand Prix Justiniano Hotels
2020
 National Road Championships
1st  Road race
4th Time trial
2021
 National Road Championships
2nd Time trial
3rd Road race
2022
 1st  Time trial, National Road Championships

Track

2018
 National Track Championships
1st  Individual pursuit
1st  Points race
3rd Team sprint
2019
 National Track Championships
1st  Individual pursuit
1st  Team pursuit
3rd Omnium
2020
 National Track Championships
1st  Individual pursuit
1st  Omnium
1st  Points race
1st  Scratch
1st  Team pursuit
2nd Kilo
2nd Team sprint
 3rd  Points race, UEC European Track Championships
2022
 National Track Championships
1st  Elimination race
1st  Individual pursuit
1st  Kilo
1st  Omnium
1st  Points race
1st  Scratch
1st  Sprint
1st  Team pursuit
1st  Team sprint
1st  Tempo race

References

External links

1991 births
Living people
Romanian male cyclists
People from Reșița
Cyclists at the 2015 European Games